An artificial reef is a human-created underwater structure, typically built to promote marine life in areas with a generally featureless bottom, to control erosion, block ship passage, block the use of trawling nets, or improve surfing.

Many reefs are built using objects that were built for other purposes, such as by sinking oil rigs (through the Rigs-to-Reefs program), scuttling ships, or by deploying rubble or construction debris. Other artificial reefs are purpose-built (e.g. the reef balls) from PVC or concrete. Shipwrecks may become artificial reefs when preserved on the seafloor. Regardless of construction method, artificial reefs generally provide hard surfaces where algae and invertebrates such as barnacles, corals, and oysters attach; the accumulation of attached marine life in turn provides intricate structures and food for assemblages of fish.

Though there's no research indicating the benefits of artificial reefs, they are still being practiced in modern times.

History 
The construction of artificial reefs began in ancient times. Persians blocked the mouth of the Tigris River to thwart Arabian pirates by building an artificial reef and during the First Punic War the Romans built a reef across the mouth of the Carthaginian harbor in Sicily to trap enemy ships within and assist in driving the Carthaginians from the island.

Artificial reefs to increase fish yields or for algaculture began no later than 17th-century Japan, when rubble and rocks were used to grow kelp. The earliest recorded artificial reef in the United States is from the 1830s, when logs from huts were used off the coast of South Carolina to improve fishing. In the Philippines a traditional native fishing technique known as fish nests (natively known by various names like gango, amatong, or balirong), is basically an artificial reef. It uses rocks and waterlogged wood to build mounds inside excavated trenches on shallow tidal waters that attract fish and crustaceans. The mounds are then harvested every few weeks during low tide by surrounding them with nets and dismantling them piece by piece. They are rebuilt after every harvest. Fish nests are often used to capture grouper fingerlings to be used as seeds for aquaculture. Fish nests were in common use since before 1939.

Beginning before the 1840s, US fishermen used interlaced logs to build artificial reefs. More recently, refuse such as old refrigerators, shopping carts, ditched cars and out-of-service vending machines replaced the logs in ad hoc reefs. Officially sanctioned projects have incorporated decommissioned ships, subway cars, battle tanks, armored personnel carriers, oil drilling rigs and beehive-like reef balls.

Development

Artificial reef communities tend to develop in more or less predictable stages. First, where an ocean current encounters a vertical structure, it can create a plankton-rich upwelling that provides a reliable feeding spot for small fish such as sardines and minnows, which draw in pelagic predators such as tuna and sharks. Next come creatures seeking protection from the ocean's lethal openness—hole and crevice dwellers such as grouper, snapper, squirrelfish, eels and triggerfish. Opportunistic predators such as jack and barracuda also appear. Over months and years the reef structure becomes encrusted with algae, tunicates, hard and soft corals and sponges.

3D printing technology has been employed both to create moulds for cast ceramic and concrete artificial reefs, and to directly create artificial reefs, also through the use of environmentally friendly materials.

An electrified reef is an artificial reef where a small low voltage electric charge is applied to a sub-sea metallic structures that causes limestone to precipitate onto a metal frame onto which coral planulae can then attach and grow; the process also speeds up post-attachment growth.

Artificial surfing reefs
Artificial surfing reefs have been created in several locations.  Supporters cite benefits such as coastal protection, habitat enhancement and coastal research. The world's first attempt was made in El Segundo, near Los Angeles, in California. The next attempt was at Mosman Beach, Perth, Western Australia. This reef was constructed of large granite rocks placed in a pyramidal shape to form an appropriate breaking wave form that would suit surfers. An artificial reef constructed of over 400 massive, geotextile bags (each larger than a bus) filled with sand was constructed in 2000 at Narrowneck on the Gold Coast of Queensland, Australia. This artificial reef had two objectives: stabilizing beach nourishment and improving surfing conditions.

Europe's first artificial reef was approved in 2008. Construction began August 30, 2008, in Boscombe, Bournemouth, UK (5 months after 3 local councillors spent 18 days in New Zealand on a fact-finding mission), and opened in November 2009. The £3 million (2.5% of the Council's annual budget that year) reef was expected to create waves up to 30% larger and double the number of surfing days annually. Construction on this reef continued from June 2008 through August 2009. Boscombe Reef was built from large sand-filled geotextile containers, totaling . It failed entirely and attempts were made to convert it into a multi purpose reef, which also failed. Bournemouth Council attempted to get a refund from the New Zealand-based reef construction company but it went into administration before paying any compensation.

In the United States coastal permitting requirements present major obstacles to building surfing reefs. The only reef built in the U.S. for surfing is southern California's "Pratte's Reef", which was constructed in 2000 and removed in 2008 as planned.

Environmental concerns 
According to environmental group The Ocean Conservancy, the Osborne Reef may be an indication that the benefits of artificial reefs need to be re-examined. Jack Sobel, a senior scientist at the group, stated "There's little evidence that artificial reefs have a net benefit," citing concerns such as toxicity from paint, plastics parts, etc., damage to ecosystems and concentrating fish into one place (worsening overfishing).

Fish-attracting device
Artificial reefs can show quick increases in local fish population rehabilitation, coral reef and algae growth. However, far more than half the amount of biomass found on artificial reefs is attracted from other areas rather than developing there. James Bohnsack, a biologist with the National Marine Fisheries Service (NMFS) concluded artificial reefs do not increase fish populations. Instead they operate as fish aggregating devices (FADs) bringing in fish from other reefs. Concentrating fish on a reef also makes for easier fishing.

The fish attracted to artificial reef zones vary from reef to reef depending on its age, size and structure. Large reef structures such as large sunken ships attract larger fish.

The use of shipwrecks in rocky zones creates a new trophic structure for the local ecosystem. They become the home for certain species and many nearby animals migrate to the shipwreck. This unbalances the natural ecosystem and has the potential to alter many other habitats.

Recreational dive sites
Thousands of popular wreck diving sites throughout the world are shipwrecks sunk as artificial reefs. Some of these wrecks were sunk deliberately to attract divers.

Potential sources of pollution

In the early 1970s waste tires had been used to create some artificial reefs. Tropical storms later demolished the tire containment system, washing tires onto beaches, destroying nearby coral reefs and inhibiting new coral growth. On the Osborne Reef off the coast of Fort Lauderdale, Florida, storms broke the nylon straps holding the original tire bundles together.  As of November 2019, 250,000 of an estimated 700,000 tires have been removed. France has begun removing its tire reefs. The Ocean Conservancy now includes tire removal during the International Coastal Cleanup in September of each year.
Since 2021, 4Ocean has added collecting tires from the bottom to their cleanup operations as well.

Erosion prevention
Some artificial reefs are used to prevent coastal erosion. They can be designed to act in multiple ways. Some are designed to force waves to deposit their energy offshore rather than directly on the coastline. Other reefs are designed to hold sediment on beaches. These reefs trap the sediment. These reefs are custom-designed for each unique zone.

Examples

Florida
Florida is the site of many artificial reefs, many created from deliberately sunken ships, including Coast Guard cutters Duane and Bibb and the U.S. Navy landing ship Spiegel Grove.

Osborne Reef

In the early 1970s, more than 2,000,000 used vehicle tires were dumped off the coast of Fort Lauderdale, Florida to form an artificial reef. However, the tires were not properly secured to the reef structures, and ocean currents broke them loose, sending them crashing into the developing reef and its natural neighbors. As of 2009, fewer than 100,000 of the tires had been removed after more than 10 years of efforts.

Neptune Reef
Neptune Memorial Reef was originally conceived as an art project called The Atlantis Reef Project and was envisioned and created by Gary Levine and Kim Brandell. Burial at sea became a way of financing the project. As of 2011, about 200 "placements" had occurred. Cremated remains are mixed with concrete and either encased in columns or molded into sea-star, brain-coral,  castings of lions or other shapes before entering the water.

Ex-USS Massachusetts
In 1921 the US battleship  was scuttled in shallow water off the coast of Pensacola, Florida and then used as a target for experimental artillery. In 1956 the ship was declared the property of the state of Florida by the Florida Supreme Court. Since 1993 the wreck has been a Florida Underwater Archaeological Preserve and is included in the National Register of Historic Places. She serves as an artificial reef and recreational dive site.

Ex-USS Oriskany

Ex-USNS Hoyt S. Vandenberg
The second-largest artificial reef is USNS Hoyt S. Vandenberg, a former World War II era troop transport that served as a spacecraft-tracking ship after the war. Supporters expected the ship to draw recreational divers away from natural reefs, allowing those reefs to recover from damage from overuse.

Ex-USS Spiegel Grove

North Carolina

Ex-USS Yancey
 was sunk as an artificial reef off Morehead City, North Carolina, 1990. She is lying on her starboard side at a depth of

Ex-USCGC Spar

Ex-USS Indra

Ex-USS Aeolus
 was sunk to form an artificial reef in August 1988.

Delaware

Redbird Reef

In the late 2000s, the New York City Transit Authority decided to retire an outdated fleet of subway cars to make room for new R142 and R142A trains. The obsolete subway cars, (nicknamed "Redbirds"), had run on the A Division (former Interborough Rapid Transit Company routes) of the New York City Subway system for 40 years. Each car was stripped, decontaminated, loaded on a barge, and sunk in the Atlantic Ocean off the coast of Delaware, Virginia, South Carolina, Georgia, and Florida. Some cars had number plates removed because of rust, which were then auctioned off on eBay. A total of 1,200 subway cars were sunk for this project.

In September 2007, the NYCTA approved a further contract with Weeks Marine worth $6 million, to send 1,600 of its retired subway cars to be used as artificial reefs. The old models were sheathed in stainless steel, except for the fiberglass reinforced plastic front ends, which were removed before sinking. The retired fleet included old work trains and cars that were badly damaged beyond repair.

Canada

British Columbia 
In 2006, a Boeing 737-200 that was deemed no longer airworthy by Air Canada was sunk by the Artificial Reef Society of British Columbia.

Mexico

Cancun Underwater Museum
Since November 2009, artist Jason deCaires Taylor has created more than 400 life size sculptures off the coast of Cancun, Mexico at the Cancun Underwater Museum. The coral reefs in this region suffered heavy degradation due to repetitive hurricane abuse. This project was funded by The National Marine Park and the Cancun Nautical Association. It was designed to emulate coral reefs using a neutral ph clay. Taylor constructed unique settings depicting daily activities ranging from a man watching TV to a 1970s replica of a Volkswagen Beetle. This artificial reef relieved pressure from the nearby Manchones Reef.

Australia
Since the late 1990s, the Australian government has been providing decommissioned warships for use as artificial reefs for recreational scuba diving. So far, seven ships have been sunk:

  at Dunsborough in Western Australia during December 1997.
  at Albany in Western Australia during November 2001.
  in Yankalilla Bay in South Australia during November 2002.
  off the Sunshine Coast in Queensland during July 2005.
  at a site west of the entrance to Port Phillip Bay in Victoria during October 2009.
  off Terrigal on the New South Wales Central Coast during April 2011
  off Hervey Bay on the Queensland Coast on 29 June 2018

Spain

Ex-SS American Star 
The former ocean liner SS American Star was wrecked on 18 January 1994 on the west coast of the island of Fuerteventura, on Playa de Garcey. By 2008, the wreck of the ship had completely collapsed and sunk, and is now lying about 10 metres underwater near the coast. Its coordinates are 28° 20′ 45.88″ N, 14° 10′ 49.59″ W.

Costa Rica
At Playa Hermosa, the Playa Hermosa Artificial Reef Project has created an artificial reef using discarded porcelain insulators.

Curacao
On Curaçao, Secore International has created 12 artificial reefs using the cost-effective technique with small tetrapod-shaped concrete structures, seeded with coral larvae.

Saba and Statia
The AROSSTA project is located at Saba and Statia. They are using MOREEFs, which are said to be more efficient then reefballs.

Gibraltar
The Gibraltar Reef was first proposed by Eric Shaw in 1973. Initial experiments with tires proved unsuccessful as the tires were swept away by currents or buried underneath sand. In 1974, boats from local marinas and the Gibraltar Port Authority were donated. The first two were barges that were sunk in Camp Bay.

In 2013, more than 70 concrete blocks were sunk, each one square meter in size with protruding metal bars. This led to heated debate between the United Kingdom and Spain, with Gibraltar accusing Spain of over forty incursions into their waters per month and Spain accusing Gibraltar of including metal bars in the reef to stop Spanish fishermen trawling the seabed for fish. The dropping led to a diplomatic conflict between the two countries because Gibraltar is a British Overseas Territory.

India

Temple Reef
The surfing reef Temple reef is off the coast of Pondicherry, India constructed of fully recycled materials such as concrete, rocks, trees, palms, and iron bars.

Dubai

Pearl of Dubai is an art-inspired Lost City off the coast of Dubai. The site encompasses five acres and is located at the World Islands.

Aqaba, Jordan

Jordan made an under-water military vehicles museum, which is intended to form an artificial reef over time.

Philippines
Underwater Chocolate Hills is an artificial reef project undertaken by Spindrift Reefs Dive Center off the coast of Panglao Island in the Philippines. It consists of broken coral harvested by local divers, who attach it to wire structures. The structures are built in the same shape as the Chocolate Hills, which can be found in the Bohol Region. The intent is to create a new dive site and new marine habitat.

Lebanon

In 2018, the Lebanese Army donated 10 stripped tanks to an NGO and sunk them 3 km away from the coast of Sidon, South Lebanon.

Australia 
Cooper Reef is a purpose-built artificial reef off the coast of Esperance, Western Australia. It is at a depth of 30m and consists of 128 dome-like concrete modules designed to attract fish and enhance fish stocks, thereby creating new fishing and recreation opportunities for tourists, anglers and local families.

Malta 
Following a gas explosion that occurred on 3 February 1995, the Libyan-owned motor tanker Um El Faroud was scuttled off the coast of Malta as an artificial reef.

Diver perception of artificial reefs

A study in Barbados showed a marked variation in diver satisfaction with artificial reef diving experiences. Novice divers tended to be more satisfied than more experienced divers, who had a strong preference for natural reefs and large shipwrecks.

See also

References

External links
 Eastern Carolina Artificial Reef Association
 Organization for Artificial Reefs
 Florida Artificial Reef Program
 Reef Ball Foundation
 

 

 
Ship disposal
Recreational diving